Rock shelter of the Equi Spa is located on the northern fringe of the Apuan Alps, not far from the famous Carrara marble quarries in northern Italy. The Rock shelter is located by a small the small hamlet of Equi Terme which is a currently developing tourist attraction with three selling points, an archaeological site, a natural cave system and a hiking trail along the northern fringe of the Apuan Alps.

Archaeology
The Rock shelter was first excavated in 1909 by a law graduate, turned-geologist and archaeologist Carlo deStefani and published the first monograph of the archaeological and palaeozoological remains of the site in 1917. Further excavations were conducted in the 1930s and 1940s, turning the Rock shelter into a cave, thanks to the large quantity of soil excavated.

External links
 http://www.grottediequi.it/

References

 deStefani C. 1916, Caverna preistorica di Equi nelle Alpi Apuane, in Mondo Sotterraneo, Rivista dei speleologia e idrologia, anno XII, n. 1–3, pp. 1–13, in part. pag. 10.
 Bigagli C., Iardella R., Palchetti A., Paribeni E. 2012, Fivizzano (MS). Equi Terme: saggio nella Grotta della Tecchia, in Notiziario Toscano 8, 2012[2013], pp. 187–189.

Archaeological sites in Italy